Alex Light (born May 2, 1996) is an American football offensive tackle who is currently a free agent. He last played for the Dallas Cowboys of the National Football League (NFL). He played college football at Richmond, and was originally signed by the Green Bay Packers as an undrafted free agent in 2018.

High school career
Light lettered in football and basketball at Salem High School. Light was a two time all state football player. He committed to Richmond over an offer from VMI.

College career
Light appeared in 43 games making 37 starts for the Spiders. During his senior season, Light received first-team all-CAA honors.

Professional career

Green Bay Packers
Light signed with the Green Bay Packers as an undrafted free agent on May 4, 2018. He made the final 53-man roster, but was inactive for most of the season. Light made his first professional appearance on December 9, 2018, in a 34–20 victory over the Atlanta Falcons. He was suspended one game on December 17, 2018 for violating the league's substance-abuse policy.

Light was waived on September 5, 2020, and was signed to the practice squad the following day. Light was released by the Packers on September 10.

Arizona Cardinals
On September 14, 2020, Light was signed to the Arizona Cardinals practice squad.

Dallas Cowboys
The next day on September 15, Light was signed by the Dallas Cowboys off the Cardinals practice squad. He was waived on October 6, 2020.

References

External links

Richmond Spiders bio

1996 births
Living people
People from Salem, Virginia
Players of American football from Virginia
American football offensive tackles
Richmond Spiders football players
Green Bay Packers players
Arizona Cardinals players
Dallas Cowboys players